Fürth Airfield is a former military airfield located in Germany about 2 miles north-northeast of the city center of Fürth in the neighborhood "Atzenhof" ;  approximately 200 miles south-southwest of Berlin. During the Weimar Republic it served as the principal civil aviation hub of the Nuremberg metropolitan region.

In World War I there was a training center of the Royal Bavarian Air Force. In the 1920s it was the first international airport of the cities Nürnberg and Fürth. The importance of the airport increased further when Junkers transferred first its central repair workshop, and then the final assembly line for its F-13 and G-24 aircraft from Dessau to Fürth. In 1935 it became again an airfield of the Luftwaffe. The airfield was used during World War II by the German Luftwaffe as a combat airfield.  It was seized in early April 1945 by the United States Army and used as a Ninth Air Force combat airfield until the end of the war in Europe. Afterwards the "Army Airfield Station Fürth" was established here, being closed in June 1947. Then it became "Monteith-Barracks" of the US Army till it was closed in 1993.

Today, the airfield is abandoned and parts of the facility remain undeveloped as a relic. A golf course now covers parts of the former airport grounds.

About 2 km south of this Airfield there was the so-called "Industrieflughafen" In 1919 there was a factory of the Gothaer Waggonfabrik and in the late 1930s it was the airport of the Bachmann von Bluhmenthal Company (Industrieflughafen Fürth). Here till 1945 Bf 110s where build, repaired and converted into Nightfighters. At the end of the war it became Army Airfield R-30, then it became Nürnberg auxiliary International Airport till the mid of the 1950s when the new 
Nürnberg International Airport was finished. Today it is completely overbuild and known as the Hardhöhe. A small plaque in the access tunnel to the subway station Fürth Hardhöhe station is the only visible reminder of that airport today.

See also

 Advanced Landing Ground

References

External links

Airfields of the United States Army Air Forces in Germany
Military airbases established in 1939
Airports in Bavaria
Defunct airports in Germany